Jaltomata weberbaueri is a plant species native to Peru. It grows on rocky hillsides at elevations less than 1800 m.

Jaltomata weberbaueri flowers are reddish-purple with white veins and red-orange nectar, up to 6 cm in diameter.

References

weberbaueri
Flora of Peru
Taxa named by Carl Lebrecht Udo Dammer